Wangtu is a town situated in Kinnaur, Himachal Pradesh, India, its geographical coordinates are 31° 33' 0" North, 78° 1' 0" East and its original name (with diacritics) is Wangtu. The nearest airport is in Shimla, which is approximately 200 km from Wangtu. It is very close to the Indo-China border, and located on the Old Hindustan-Tibet Road. Wangtu was affected by the 1975 Kinnaur earthquake.

External links 
 http://www.fallingrain.com/world/IN/11/Wangtu.html

Cities and towns in Kinnaur district
Tourism in Himachal Pradesh